The Battle of Markada (also spelled "Markadah" or "Markadahin") was a military confrontation between two jihadist groups, al Qaeda's al-Nusra Front and the Islamic State of Iraq and the Levant (ISIL), over the town of Markada in the Al-Hasakah Governorate, in March 2014 during the Syrian civil war. The strategic importance of the town to the ISIL lay in its position on the group's weapons supply route from Iraq, the road linking Al-Hasakah with Deir ez-Zor and a hill that dominates the surrounding area. On the ISIL side there were many Sunni Iranians, including Kurds, who played an important role in the battle.

Battle
The battle started on 21 March 2014, with fighting near Markada's grain silos that left 27 al-Nusra Front fighters dead and others missing.

On the morning of 27 March, ISIL attacked the town, which was being held by the al-Nusra Front. ISIL managed to force al-Nusra to withdraw to the town's hospital and the mountain overlooking Markada.

Before dawn on 29 March, clashes erupted in the town as ISIL attacked the hospital and al-Nusra positions in the mountain. After heavy fighting that left 43 al-Nusra and 13 ISIL fighters dead, ISIL took full control of the town as al-Nusra forces retreated towards the town of al-Sour in the eastern rural area of Deir ez-Zor province. Many al-Nusra fighters were also captured. Among those killed was also the top provincial ISIL commander, Omar al-Farouk al-Turki.

On 31 March, al-Nusra launched a counterattack in an attempt to recapture the town. By this time, the number of those killed since the start of the fighting had risen to 120.

References

Bibliography 

Military operations of the Syrian civil war in 2014
Military operations of the Syrian civil war involving the Islamic State of Iraq and the Levant
Military operations of the Syrian civil war involving the al-Nusra Front
Al-Hasakah District
Battles of the Syrian civil war